David Taylor Kellock (1913–1988) was an Australian stained glass artist, active from the late 1940s until the 1970s.

Life and career
Born in Dunfermline, Scotland, on 19 January 1913, Kellock studied in Edinburgh and worked at the Victoria and Albert Museum, London, before coming to Australia in the 1930s. In the United Kingdom, he specialised in stained glass, textiles, fabric printing, dye mixing and pottery work, including glass mixing.

Kellock was appointed Head of the Art Department at the Hobart Technical College and examiner in history of architecture for the RAIA in Tasmania from 1939 to 1941. He was in charge of the art school at Geelong Grammar School and moved to Ballarat in 1946, where he began his stained glass business and was also art teacher at the Ballarat School of Mines.

Kellock was a fellow of the British Society of Master Glass Painters, a fellow of the Royal Society of Arts in London and an associate of the Stained Glass Association of America.

Artistic philosophy
In 1946, Kellock wrote "Appreciation is not a mere matter of caprice; we must not be satisfied by 'This pleases me, That does not' ... We may learn to feel more widely and to ... find pleasure in qualities which at first were not apparent. Even as artists we should understand and practise appreciation, for a sympathy with others is of value in completing and enriching our own work. We are not only artists, we are also human beings ... Unless art is of some use to humanity and makes life better and richer, humanity will pass it by ... Under all forms of art, there lies a common principle. The human mind is capable of ... a scientific or intellectual form ... an emotional or imaginative form ... It is this touch of emotion and imagination which is the essence of art."

Commissions
Kellock carried out a wide range of commissions for Australia's leading church architect, Louis Williams, in his churches, chapels and schools, with fifty-five windows for St Mark's Chapel, Flinders Naval Depot (Westernport) in Victoria; seventeen windows for St John's in Camberwell, Victoria; St Giles' in Murrumbeena, Victoria; Geelong Grammar school chapel in Geelong, Victoria; All Saints' Newtown, Geelong; St Andrew's, Brighton; St Mark's in Red Cliffs, Victoria; St George's in Parkes, New South Wales; All Saints' in Canowindra, New South Wales, and St Stephen's, Adamstown, New South Wales; St Edmund's, Wembley, Western Australia; St David's Cathedral in Hobart, Tasmania; St John's, Devonport, Tasmania, Holy Trinity, Ulverstone, Tasmania..

The stained glass Kellock made for St Mark's Chapel, honouring Royal Australian Navy crews and ships lost in action, was among his most outstanding achievements.

Kellock also worked for other architects and his memorial windows are in the Littlejohn Memorial Chapel in Scotch College, Melbourne, Melbourne Grammar School Chapel, St John's, Beaufort, Victoria; St Augustine's, in the City of Moreland; St Paul's Ballarat; St John's, Balian, Christ Church Cathedral, Grafton, New South Wales, Methodist church, Albury, New South Wales and windows in Brisbane and Tasmania.

David Taylor Kellock died on 6 June 1988 in Berwick, Melbourne, Victoria.

References

Gladys Marie Moore: Louis Reginald Williams. University of Melbourne, August 2001
Bronwyn Hughes: Twentieth Century Stained Glass in Melbourne Churches. University of Melbourne, 1997.

Australian stained glass artists and manufacturers
1913 births
1988 deaths
Artists from Victoria (Australia)
People from Dunfermline
Geelong Grammar School
Scottish emigrants to Australia
20th-century Australian artists